The Albanian local elections in 1992 was the first local election held in Albania. The elections were held on 26 July 1992 and the general winner was the coalition Socialist Party of Albania with 49.87% of the vote. The Democratic Party of Albania however, won in capital of Tirana.

Results 
The Democratic party received less votes alone compared to its government coalition. However, The Democrats won in Berat, Elbasan, Fier, Lushnjë, Durrës, Vlorë, Shkodër, and Tirana. The winner in Tirana would be Sali Kelmendi. The Socialists and their Left Wing Coalition would win in the Lezhë, Gjirokastër, Peshkopi, Fier, Kukës. About 9% of the votes were invalid. Voter Turnout was at 70.65%

References

1992 elections in Europe
1992
Local elections
July 1992 events in Europe